Strait Regional School Board is a Canadian school board operating 25 schools in eastern Nova Scotia's counties of Richmond, Antigonish, Inverness, and Guysborough.

The school board has a student population of 7,281 and it employs 612 teachers. The annual budget of the board is approximately $66 million (CAD).

Schools

 Inverness County
 Pleasant Bay School - Grades Primary to 6
 Cape Breton Highlands Education Centre/Academy - Grades Primary to 12
 Inverness Education Centre/Academy - Grades Primary to 12
 Dalbrae Academy - Grades 9 to 12
 Bayview Education Centre - Grades Primary to 8
 Whycocomagh Education Centre - Grades Primary to 8
 SAERC - Grades 9 to 12
 Tamarac Education Centre - Grades Primary to 8
 Richmond County
 East Richmond Education Centre - Grades Primary to 8
 Felix Marchand Education Centre - Grades Primary to 4
 Richmond Academy - Grades 9 to 12
 West Richmond Education Centre - Grades 5 to 8
 Antigonish County
 East Antigonish Education Centre/Academy - Grades Primary to 12
 Rev. H.J. MacDonald School - Grades Primary to 6 (No Longer open as a school, being turned into a community centre.)
 St. Andrew's Consolidated School - Grades Primary to 6
 Dr. John Hugh Gillis Regional High School - Grades 9 to 12
 Antigonish Education Centre - Grades Primary to 4
 St. Andrew Junior School - Grades 5 to 8
 H.M. MacDonald Elementary School - Grades Primary to 6
 Guysborough County
 Mulgrave Memorial Education Centre - Grades Primary to 8
 Chedabucto Education Centre/Guysborough Academy - Grades Primary to 12
 Fanning Education Centre - Grades Primary to 8
 Canso Academy - Grades 9 to 12
 St. Mary's Academy (Nova Scotia) - Grades 8 to 12
 St. Mary's Education Centre - Grades Primary to 7

Former schools

Whycocomagh Consolidated School 
Whycocomagh Consolidated School (WCS) was a grade primary to grade 12 school located in Whycocomagh, Nova Scotia, Canada. It closed in 2000, after Dalbrae Academy was opened as the new high school for the students in the area and a new school was built for grades primary to eight. The school's colours were royal blue and gold, and the high school teams were called Whycocomagh Thunder. The school fell under the jurisdiction of the Strait Regional School Board. The closure of the school came after a long battle with the government.

Members

External links
 Strait Regional School Board

School districts in Nova Scotia
Education in Inverness County, Nova Scotia
Education in Richmond County, Nova Scotia
Education in Antigonish County, Nova Scotia
Education in Guysborough County, Nova Scotia